It was a Dacian fortified settlement located near the present town of Aghireșu, Romania.

References

Dacian fortresses in Cluj County
Historic monuments in Cluj County